Meenakshi, also known as Sharmilee or Sharmili (in Tamil/Telugu), is a Malayalam actress. She made her debut in  Malayalam films.  The Kerala Film Critics Association named her their 2005 debutante artist. In all of her Tamil-language films, she was credited as Sharmilee. In Malayalam, she rechristened herself as Meenakshi, the character she played in Kakkakarumbam.

Early life
Meenakshi was born and raised in Kozhencherry, Pathanamthitta district. Growing up in Kozhencherry, Sharmily speaks Hindi, English, Malayalam and Tamil.
But Meenakshi left for Chennai to pursue higher studies.
Meenakshi graduated in Mathematics from the Stella Maris College, Chennai. and received a Master of Computer Applications (MCA) in India.  While in school, she received several acting offers, which she rejected so that she could concentrate on her studies. She did modelling and later hosted a popular phone-in programme, Kasumele on Jaya TV. People were instantly attracted by her cheerful and youthful approach to anchoring. After graduation, she started her career in films.

Career
Her debut Tamil movie was Aasai Aasaiyai in 2003 with Jiiva, who also made his debut with this film. This movie was not very well received in the box office even though the story and Sharmeelee's acting got good reviews from critics. This was then followed by Anbe Anbe with Shaam was classified as a medium hit in the box office. Her third Tamil movie was Diwan with Sarathkumar. This movie won her rave reviews for her performance. It was followed by her Telugu entry through the movie Taarak in 2003. In 2004, she made her debut in Malayalam Industry with two movies - Vellinakshatram and Kaakkakarumban.  Her first movie Vellinakshatram was a mega hit and her performance was appreciated by many. After that she established herself in Malayalam movies with a string of hit movies. The same year, Youth festival and Black(cameo appearance) were also released. Later however, she failed to sustain in Malayalam film industry and tried her luck in other regional languages.

In 2005, she appeared in the movie Junior Senior, where she acted aside Mukesh and Kunchacko Boban. This movie was a remake of Hindi classic hit, Yes Boss, where Meenakshi reprised the role played by Juhi Chawla. Same year, Ponmudipuzhayorathu was also released. Most of the songs she acted in were hits. "Oru chri kandaal" was one of the top songs of Malayalam in the year 2005. So was " Kalla Kalla Kochu Kalla". Later, Meenakshi faded away from the films.

Personal life
In 2004, Meenakshi told an interviewer that "I love to act in more Malayalam films as the characters here have depth and the heroines have much more to do than just look good."

Filmography

Other Work
She has acted in some advertisements including Kumarikalpam Tonic, Plaza Jewellery, Pooja Milk, Vanamala Washing Powder etc. She hosted Kaasu Mele, live show.

References

External links
 

Living people
Actresses from Kozhikode
University of Calicut alumni
Actresses in Malayalam cinema
Indian film actresses
21st-century Indian actresses
Actresses in Telugu cinema
Stella Maris College, Chennai alumni
Actresses in Tamil cinema
1985 births